Dead Cell may refer to:

"Dead Cell", a song on the album Infest by American band Papa Roach
Dead Cell, a fictional organization from the video game Metal Gear Solid 2: Sons of Liberty
Dead Cells, a 2018 video game